Western Connecticut is a geographic region of Connecticut located in the southwest corner of the state. Numerous towns are part of the Western Connecticut Council of Governments (or WestCOG), one 9 regional councils of governments in Connecticut. Within this region, there are two Metropolitan Planning Organizations, those being the South Western CT MPO and the Housatonic Valley MPO. The region includes  the Connecticut Panhandle, Greater Danbury and the Gold Coast.

Towns and cities
The following is a list of the 18 member cities and towns of the Western Connecticut Council of Governments:

Bethel
Bridgewater
Brookfield
Danbury
Darien
Greenwich
New Canaan
New Fairfield
New Milford
Newtown
Norwalk
Redding
Ridgefield
Sherman
Stamford
Weston
Westport
Wilton

References

External links
South Western Regional Planning Agency

Regions of Connecticut
Metropolitan areas of Connecticut
New York metropolitan area
Government of Connecticut